Stony Man is a fictional clandestine anti-terrorist organization featured in the Executioner series of action-adventure novels first published in 1983 by American Gold Eagle publishers. The first book in the series, Stony Man Doctrine was published as a king-size one-shot in 1983, which became regarded as the first oversized Super Bolan book. In 1991, the Stony Man series began with Stony Man #2 (picking up from the 1983 novel) and ran continuously for a total of 140 novels, ending in late 2015.

History

Answerable only to the White House, Stony Man handles anti-terrorist and anti-crime missions that are beyond the capability of established agencies like the CIA, NSA, and FBI. This usually means a mission that the U.S. Government can disclaim any knowledge of if it goes sour, or something that is just too dangerous for regular agencies to handle.

Operating out of a former CIA training facility located in Virginia's Blue Ridge Mountains, Stony Man was created to tap into the expertise of Mack Bolan, a.k.a. the Executioner, for a covert war against terrorism. Bolan was the perfect choice to lead this new war because of his successful campaign against the Mafia. In his new identity of Col. John Phoenix, U.S. Army (Retired), Bolan undertook several campaigns against terrorists and the KGB, sometimes leading either Able Team or Phoenix Force. In the novel Stony Man Doctrine, he led both teams against a massive terrorist campaign against the United States. All their missions were successful.

However, Mack Bolan and Stony Man would learn that success came with a price.

A KGB-sponsored mercenary team led by a former Green Beret named Al Miller assaults the Stony Man compound in an effort to wipe out the organization. The team is dealt with, but not without casualties. The Stony Man computer expert, Aaron Kurtzman, is permanently paralyzed from the waist down. Andrzej Konzaki, Stony Man's weaponsmith is killed in the attack. The most painful casualty for Bolan was the death of his lover, April Rose, who was Stony Man's mission controller.  Ms. Rose deliberately steps in the path of a bullet fired by Captain Wade. The Captain, head of Stony Man security, was also a mole for Al Miller and his cohorts. Wade had killed Miller to keep from being exposed and tried to assassinate Bolan, but Ms. Rose's sacrifice prevented this.  Stony Man was attacked three more times subsequent to this attack, once by Jared Quillian, a renegade industrialist, the second time by a leftover Russian KGB agent who posed as a Stony Man Blacksuit and used an investigative reporter seeking to make a name for herself as an unwitting accomplice, and the third time by forces from the Nazi organization COMCON.

In another blow to the organization, Mack Bolan, in his identity of Col. John Phoenix, was framed for the assassination of Damien Macek, labor leader and anti-communist dissident, by the KGB, resulting in him being labeled a dangerous, unstable renegade by all law-enforcement and intelligence agencies. In an effort to clear his name, Bolan discovered the plot was conceived by Maj. Gen. Greb Strakhov, head of the KGB's Department 13 executive action unit. Strakhov had masterminded the Macek plot in revenge for the death of his only son, Kyril Strakhov, a test pilot Bolan had killed during a mission in Afghanistan to recover a top-secret attack helicopter called Dragonfire.

During his quest to clear his name, Bolan uncovered evidence that Lee Farnsworth, the director of a rival agency called the CFB (Central Foreign Bureau), was Strakhov's mole inside America's intelligence apparatus. After giving the evidence to the President of the United States, Bolan executed Farnsworth in the Oval Office itself. 

After this confrontation, Bolan initiated a one-man war against the KGB, working from a master list of all major KGB agents that he obtained during a mission in Moscow days earlier. He also struck out at other terrorist groups and resumed his war against his old enemy, the Mafia.

After this lengthy one-man war and some soul-searching—not to mention the kidnapping of Hal Brognola's family by the Mafia and renegade CIA agents—Bolan entered into an arms-length alliance with Stony Man, working with his former comrades, but not rejoining the organization outright.

Gold Eagle combined the two Executioner spin-off books, Able Team and Phoenix Force, to create the Stony Man series of novels, which are still being published as of 2008.

Commando teams
Able Team

Able Team has been assigned to handle anti-terrorist missions inside the United States, but sometimes operates in the lower Americas and Mexico. Its members are Hermann 'Gadgets' Schwarz, Carl 'Ironman' Lyons, and Rosario 'Politician' Blancanales.

Phoenix Force

Phoenix Force has been assigned to handle anti-terrorist missions outside the United States, but sometimes has handled missions inside U.S. borders if they had international implications. Its current members are David McCarter, Gary Manning, Rafael Encizo, Calvin James, and T.J. Hawkins.

Stony Man crew
In their fight against criminals and terrorists, Mack Bolan, Able Team and Phoenix Force would be supported by a cadre of loyal allies, some of whom have associations with Mack Bolan from his first Mafia war.

Current
Hal Brognola
Harold Brognola is the Stony Man project director. He is responsible for assigning missions to both Phoenix Force and Able Team, as well as providing them with intelligence, weapons, transportation, and anything else they may require to conduct their assignments. Brognola enjoys chewing on expensive cigars.  

Hal is most frequently seen chomping down large amounts of antacid tablets and is almost never without a roll or two in his pockets.  Being a high-ranking Justice Department official, Hal frequently shuttles back and forth between Stony Man and Washington, D.C. (which he frequently refers to as Wonderland or Wonderland on the Potomac).

Started his law-enforcement career as a police officer in Washington, D.C., then went on to become an FBI agent, eventually leading the task force assigned to bring in Mack Bolan. After briefly chasing Bolan for some time, Hal came to realize that the Executioner was doing a public service and secretly assisted him in his anti-Mafia campaigns. He would later move on to the Sensitive Operations Group, the covert operations section of the Justice Department, which would later have the Stony Man organization under its auspices.

Jack Grimaldi
Stony Man's ace pilot, Grimaldi is often called on to assist in situations which require the use of air assets. Grimaldi is competent with all aircraft, both fixed-wing and helicopters.

A Vietnam veteran, Grimaldi once flew for the Mafia until he encountered Mack Bolan, who converted him to his cause. Until Stony Man was assembled, Grimaldi served as Bolan's mole, giving the Executioner information on the travels of high-ranking mobsters. Grimaldi would later undertake his first mission for Stony Man when he rescued Mack Bolan during a mission in Panama. 

In the series, Jack Grimaldi pilots the Dragon Slayer, a high-tech transport helicopter with attack capabilities. The Dragon Slayer is outfitted with a 7.62mm minigun and an array of missiles and rockets. It is fast and highly maneuverable, not to mention comfortable for the pilot and passengers.

Aaron "The Bear" Kurtzman
Kurtzman is the computer expert of the Stony Man farm. His role is to obtain intel from other government agencies and process it. Kurtzman lost the use of his legs in an assault on Stony Man Farm, and has since been forced to use a wheelchair.  He has made several attempts to regain the use of his legs.

Aaron is called "The Bear" because of his physical makeup, sort of like a bear.

Aaron is best known for his coffee, which he always has brewing in Stony Man's computer annex.  His coffee, which he serves in ceramic mugs, has often been referred to as swill. It has often been said that the most gutsy thing a Stony Man personnel can do is to drink a cup of Aaron's coffee.

Barbara Price
Taking over from April Rose, Barbara Price serves as Stony Man's mission controller. At the request of the President, she assisted with the security clearances when Stony Man was initially set up. She and Mack Bolan are friends and sometimes lovers. She was married to Washington, D.C. defense attorney Kevin Shawnessy for four years, but divorced him because of his countless affairs with other women.

Used to work for the NSA as a mission controller and operated under the secret identity of Canary. Had a second cousin on her mother's side who was a member of Greenpeace until the 1970s, when he was thrown out for advocating violence.

Buck Greene
Taking over from the man who replaced the traitorous Captain Wade, Buck Greene serves as Stony Man's chief of security and leads the Blacksuits, a security force maintained by Stony Man to provide security for the Farm. Greene once worked on the embassy security detail for the United States Marine Corps. Reports directly to Barbara Price.

Charlie Mott
A former Vietnam veteran and ex-Marine, Charlie Mott is the second Stony Man pilot, behind Jack Grimaldi. Even though he prefers to stick to pilot duties, he has often had to do commando work. Listed as being Canadian in the novel Stony Man V.

John Kissinger
Taking over from the murdered Andrzej Konzaki, John 'Cowboy' Kissinger serves as Stony Man's weaponsmith. Kissinger first worked for the Bureau of Narcotics and Dangerous Drugs, the predecessor to the DEA. After the dismantling of the BNDD, Kissinger went freelance, offering his talents to companies like Colt, Beretta, Heckler & Koch, and IMI.

The CIA considered hiring Kissinger, but he met Aaron Kurtzman, who recommended him to Brognola. Thus began his career as Stony Man's weapon specialist. He invented his own handgun, the QA-18 Stealthshooter, whose design was stolen by his crooked partner, Howard Crosley. He was able to recover his invention during an Able Team mission in Alabama, selling the patent shortly thereafter. Since joining Stony Man, Kissinger's talents have been to the benefit of Mack Bolan, Able Team and Phoenix Force, including instances where he has improved on Konzaki's designs. Has often participated in Stony Man field missions.  He was once asked his full name to which he replied "you will never believe it."  This was because of the last name Kissinger.

Prof. Huntington Wethers
A former cybernetics professor at UCLA, Huntington 'Hunt' Wethers was recruited by Aaron Kurtzman for his expertise in computers and cybernetics. While Kurtzman looks at computers as a means of leveraging information, Wethers looks at computers as a science.

Akira Tokaido
Of Japanese extraction, Akira Tokaido is an expert computer hacker and the youngest member of Stony Man's cybernetic team. He listens to rock music on his headphones, which are often attached to a cassette player or CD player, claiming that it helps him focus on his work. At times, he is unconventional in his thinking and is cocky. He is an expert in kanji and has a deep interest in learning about his Japanese heritage.

Leo Turrin
Like Mack Bolan, Rosario Blancanales and Hermann Schwarz, Leo 'The Pussy' Turrin is a Vietnam veteran and former Green Beret. His association with the Mafia came because of connections his family had. He rose up through the ranks and became a capo, involving himself in various criminal activities. However, his Mafia associates were unaware of his most important—and most dangerous—secret:

Leo Turrin was a federal agent.

Code-named Sticker, Turrin was assigned to infiltrate the Mafia at the highest levels by Hal Brognola. During his undercover assignment, Turrin became head of the Mafia's prostitution racket during his stint with the family of Don Sergio Frenchi in Pittsfield, Massachusetts, Mack Bolan's hometown. In this capacity, he was inadvertently responsible for the Executioner's sister, Cindy Bolan, becoming a prostitute to help her father pay off the debt he had with Triangle Industrial Finance, Frenchi's loan sharking outfit.

Unaware of Turrin's dual role, Bolan targeted him for execution in one of his first battles with the Mafia, but his execution attempt was thwarted by Turrin's wife, Angelina. It was only later that Bolan became aware of Turrin's true mission. Since then, he and Turrin became allies and close friends, a friendship that became stronger when Turrin's family had been kidnapped by Mafia soldiers.

When Turrin's role in the Mafia ended, he became a high-ranking Justice Department official under the name Leonard Justice. To this day, his Mafia associates think he is semi-retired but available for special matters related to the mob.

Former
Dr. Lao Ti
Of Vietnamese and Mongolian extraction, Lao Ti was brought in to serve as Stony Man's communications and computer specialist after the death of April Rose during the attack on Stony Man Farm. Even though she was originally Aaron Kurtzman's technical assistant, she often joined Able Team in the field. During an Able Team mission involving Maria Blancanales, the youngest of two sisters of Rosario 'Pol' Blancanales, Lao Ti was severely wounded during a shoot-out and took an extended leave of absence from her Stony Man duties. Was contacted by the State Department, who offered her a position with the U.S. Embassy in Taipei, Taiwan.

Deceased
April Rose
As the first mission controller and overseer of Stony Man Farm, the organization's headquarters, April Rose would at first seem an unlikely choice to become part of a counter-terrorist organization. She had started out as a pacifist, disapproving of war and its violent nature. She first met Mack Bolan during the closing week of his first Mafia war, when Hal Brognola had assigned her to drive the Executioner's War Wagon, which was a surprise to Bolan when he first met her. In response to that surprise, April challengingly asked him the following question:

You don't like what you see?  

His reply did not come until a mission involving a renegade Japanese industrialist (Executioner #53: Invisible Assassins) when he replied, "I like what I see, April." Standing over her grave, Bolan would later say, "Yes, April, I love what I see."  

Hal once said of April, "This woman could be the love of Mack's life," describing her as "having a super model's figure."  It is presumed that Hal recruited April as an inducement to get Bolan to join Stony Man.  April's biggest desire was to be "Mrs. Bolan."

As a pacifist, she had disapproved of Bolan on ethical and personal grounds when they first met, even though she had found herself attracted to the big man in black. That all changed when the Executioner saved her life during one of his missions against the Mafia. She abandoned her pacifist ways and became loyal to Bolan and his cause.

This loyalty would motivate her to fight alongside Bolan during his stint at Stony Man, including his mission against Paradine, a freelance mercenary Bolan believed dead in a previous mission. During a firefight in his second encounter with Paradine, April was severely wounded. In the first attack on Stony Man Farm, April's final act of loyalty was to step in the path of the bullet fired by the traitorous Captain Wade. She is buried alongside the late Andrzej Konzaki on the grounds of Stony Man Farm.

Her favorite song was On The Road Again, sung by Willie Nelson.

Andrzej Konzaki
Before John Kissinger came along, Konzaki was the first weaponsmith for Stony Man. He served in Vietnam as the leader of his own platoon. During the Tet Offensive, Konzaki led his platoon to the rescue of a unit that had been ambushed. During the mission, Konzaki was himself ambushed by a sniper who had shot him in both legs. He earned a Silver Star for his actions, but lost his legs.

He was recruited by the CIA for his expertise as an armorer and weapons expert, assigning him to their Special Weapons Development branch. When Stony Man was first assembled, Konzaki was unofficially attached to the organization. His talents proved helpful to Stony Man, including his re-engineering of Mack Bolan's Beretta 93-R machine pistol. His most well-known Stony Man innovation is a specially modified Atchisson Assault Shotgun he made for Carl Lyons.

He became the first casualty in the attack on Stony Man Farm, and Lyons would call his modified shotgun the Konzak to honor him.

Associates
In their fight against evil, Stony Man and Mack Bolan had allies who were not members of Stony Man, yet were very helpful.

Current
Brig. Gen. James Crawford, USA Ret.
A native of Arkansas, James Crawford is a retired brigadier general of the U.S. Army, and was Mack Bolan's commanding officer in Vietnam. He oversaw the creation of both Stony Man and the Central Foreign Bureau, the agency run by Lee Farnsworth. In Executioner #62, Day Of Mourning, Crawford, like the President, hoped to work out a compromise between the two agencies. His daughter, Kelly Crawford, was the girlfriend of Grover Jones, a.k.a. Damu Abdul Ali, an associate of Al Miller, but broke up with Jones after he used her as a shield in a confrontation with Bolan.

Tommy Anders
Born Giuseppe Androsepitone, Tommy Anders is a stand-up comic known as the Ethnician, so named for poking fun at people's ethnic preconceptions and prejudices, with the Ranger Girls serving as his back-up act. His association with Mack Bolan began when he ran afoul of the Mafia, incurring their wrath by refusing to associate with Mafia-affiliated promoters and booking agents. It was some time after that Anders secretly became a federal agent, joining Carl Lyons and the Ranger Girls in Hal Brognola's SOG.

The Ranger Girls
Serving as the back-up act for Tommy Anders, the Ranger Girls were a group of female multi-talented musicians led by Toby Ranger, the girl for which the group is named.

Introduced in Vegas Vendetta and reappearing in Hawaiian Hellground and Detroit Deathwatch, Toby Ranger was Bolan's most frequent companion, and his only repeat engagement, until the introduction of April Rose.

The other girls were Georgette Chebleu, a French-Canadian, Smiley Dublin and Sally Palmer. Mack Bolan became acquainted with them during his first Mafia war, when Toby risked her life to help him during a mission in Las Vegas. It was only after the end of the mission that Bolan discovered that the Ranger Girls were federal agents. Before Stony Man was founded, the Ranger Girls, Carl Lyons and Tommy Anders worked with the Executioner on many missions, including a mission in Hawaii to bring down an alliance between the Mafia and Communist China. 

Currently, there are only three Ranger Girls still involved in crimefighting. The fourth Ranger Girl, Georgette Chebleu, was tortured and mutilated by Mafia turkey doctor Fat Sal, prompting Bolan to give her a mercy bullet. The Executioner would later avenge her death.  

The Ranger Girls once aided Bolan in an escape from the Mafia by attracting attention with a "wild go-go routine."  Go Go routines were extremely popular in those days.  This author remembers Toby by a catch phrase when she was attempting to get Mack to help out with one of their missions when she said, "We're soging it."  Soging was a made-up word out of the acronym for the group - Sensitive Operations Group or SOG for short.

Johnny Gray
Johnny Gray is Mack Bolan's younger brother. Born in Pittsfield, Massachusetts, he was the only survivor of the murder-suicide that occurred in the Bolan family home while Mack Bolan himself was serving in Vietnam. It was he who revealed to his older brother that their sister, Cindy Bolan, had become a prostitute to help her father with the debt he incurred from Triangle Industrial Finance.

After he began his war, Mack Bolan left Johnny in the care of a former lover, Valentina Querente. The Mafia learned of Johnny's connection to the Executioner after Querente enrolled him in a private Massachusetts school that had the child of Harold 'The Skipper' Sicilia, Boston's capo, among its students. Sicilia and his men kidnapped both Johnny and Querente to use against the Executioner, but his scheme backfired, because Bolan not only rescued them but also brought down Sicilia's empire.

Years later, Querente would marry federal agent Jack Gray, and the two would raise Johnny as their own, giving him the last name of Gray, with Bolan as his middle name. Johnny would join the Navy and participate in a mission in Lebanon, which would be his first taste of combat.

When Bolan became Col. John Phoenix, Leo Turrin and Hal Brognola led Johnny to believe that he had died. It was only after he moved to San Diego that he learned that his older brother was still alive. The two would meet and go head-to-head with San Diego's godfather, Manny 'The Mover' Marcello, and his daughter, Angelina. During this mission, Johnny's fiancé, Sandy Darlow, became a victim of the Mafia's turkey specialists, like the late Georgette Chebleu.

At the end of the mission, Johnny proposed the idea of a support base where Mack Bolan could get some R and R and be safe from harm. Operating out of a secluded home in Del Mar, California, the support base would be called Strongbase One and contain the latest weapons and technology for the Executioner to use in his war against evil.

Johnny Gray is one of the few people outside of Stony Man who knows intimate details about the organization without having visited it. Often provides intelligence to Stony Man and Mack Bolan. Also, he participates in some of his brother's missions, much to the Executioner's misgivings.

Deceased
Nino Tattaglia
Nino Tattaglia's association with Mack Bolan goes back to his first Mafia war. Tattaglia was an underboss for Don Carlo Nazarione, head of the Mafia in Baltimore, Maryland. However, during his Mafia career, he was captured by federal agents for a double homicide. He was given a choice: become a government informant, or face the electric chair. 

He wisely chose the former option, operating under the code-name Sticker, like Leo Turrin before him, and in fact replacing Turrin as the primary source for inside information on the mob. His information came in handy on an Executioner mission in Baltimore, when he notified Bolan on the Nazarione family's attempt to take over the Baltimore Police Department with the help of one of its high-ranking officers, Capt. Harley Davis. With Nino's help, Bolan ended the plot and dealt with Nazarione once and for all.

During his time as a mole, Tattaglia underwent some private changes. He was no longer the evil criminal he once was and was now committed to the cause of justice. He would pay a terrible price for that commitment, as his double role was discovered by the Mafia, causing him to be executed by the mob. To this day, his presence is missed by Bolan, Brognola and Turrin.

Georgette Chebleu
The only Ranger Girl to be killed in action during a tour of duty with the Justice Department. A French-Canadian, Chebleu became acquainted with Mack Bolan during his Las Vegas mission. During another Bolan mission in Detroit, Michigan, she was captured by Mafia soldiers and brought to Fat Sal, the Mafia turkey doctor. She was severely tortured and mutilated before Bolan came to rescue her. Unwilling to let her continue to suffer, Bolan shot her at point-blank range through the head. He avenged her death by killing those involved. Chebleu would, therefore, not have a chance to become part of Stony Man.

Enemies
Stony Man has locked horns with the most dangerous enemies to freedom and justice. They range from organized crime syndicates and terrorist groups to private companies involved in criminal activity.

Criminal organizations
MERGE
After the losses they suffered at the hands of Mack Bolan during his war on organized crime, remnants of the Mafia formed alliances with the Unione Corse, the Colombian cartels and the Mexican Mafia to form MERGE. Phoenix Force uncovered the existence of the organization while investigating the assassinations of two American officials in the Bahamas.

They would later come across MERGE again in San Francisco while tracking the perpetrators of an attack on officers of the U.S. Coast Guard off the California coast. This time, however, they discovered that MERGE had locked horns with its Oriental counterpart, a syndicate called TRIO. They would also discover that TRIO was responsible for the attack on the Coast Guard officers.

MERGE would later resurface in the Los Angeles area, where they kidnapped a scientist who was involved in the Strategic Defense Initiative and held him for ransom to either the United States or the Soviet Union. In this encounter with MERGE, Karl Hahn stood in as a replacement for Rafael Encizo, who was recovering from the injury he received on a mission against ODESSA in France.

Their last known confrontation with MERGE was down in Colombia, involving one of its kingpins, a Bolivian drug lord named El Tiburon. His organization, known as El Dorado, had an association with the Colombian cartels and had been selected by MERGE to handle their latest enterprise: coordinated attacks against law enforcement teams dedicated to stopping the drug trade. To this end, El Tiburon formed an alliance with a Cuban military officer named Major Pescador. Phoenix Force invaded El Tiburon's lair and ended the scheme. During this mission, Rafael Encizo found his long-lost younger brother, Raul Encizo, who had become a Communist and was helping Maj. Pescador in his work with MERGE.

TRIO
An Oriental counterpart to MERGE, TRIO was made up of the three most powerful organized crime groups in the Far East.

The Yi-chyun Hai Shee, or Black Serpent Society (which should more properly be "Hei She Shehui"), was the Chinese part of TRIO. It was one of many tongs formed in the 17th century to combat the tyranny of China's Manchu overlords. Under the command of its leader, Wang Tse-Tu, the Black Serpent Society was one of the few tongs to go international, establishing branches in the United States and Western Europe.

The Hebi Uji, or Snake Clan (which more properly should be "Hebi Ichizoku" as "uji" translates as "maggot"), was the Japanese part of TRIO. It was one of the countless Yakuza organizations that had roots in feudal Japan, where they were described as being "thieves with honor." Led by Shimo Goro, the Snake Clan already had established a foothold in America by the time Japan became a player in international trade. Like most Yakuza organizations, the Snake Clan became involved in gambling, prostitution and gunrunning.

The New Horde was the Mongolian part of TRIO. Under the command of Tosha Khan, the New Horde was involved in counterfeiting, white slavery, drugs, assassination and professional thievery. Born Altajin Illyvich Dzadgad, Tosha Khan claimed to be a descendant of Genghis Khan, the famed Mongol conqueror. Even though its activities were widespread and had a lot of manpower, the New Horde did not have the connections and influence he needed to be a player in organized crime. Therefore, he had to join forces with the Black Serpent Society and the Snake Clan.

Thus, TRIO was born.

Phoenix Force first learned of TRIO when it was investigating the aforementioned attack on the Coast Guard officers off California. It was during this mission that Calvin James got Phoenix Force in touch with John Trent, his old friend from his days in the SFPD. To help Phoenix Force, Trent turned to his uncle, Inoshiro Nakezuri, who had by this time become part of another Yakuza clan, the Kaiju Clan. The information Nakezuri gave to his nephew was of great value to Phoenix Force.

Phoenix Force would later confront TRIO again in the Philippines, where they were investigating the disappearance of a Colombian ship carrying priceless treasure from Colombia. They would discover that TRIO attacked the ship and joined forces with the New People's Army, the Filipino Communist terrorist organization. They also learned that Lt. Robert Ferris and Lt. Daniel Mitchell, two American Naval Intelligence officers in charge of a contingent of U.S. Navy personnel assigned to protect the ship, had assisted TRIO in taking the ship in exchange for money to pay off severe gambling debts. With the assistance of Mahmud, a Filipino native and friend of David McCarter, Phoenix Force recovered the treasure.

In an unusual situation (Phoenix Force #27: Weep, Moscow, Weep), Phoenix Force would join forces with the KGB to recover a biological weapon stolen from a Russian laboratory by the New Horde as part of a campaign of blackmail against the nations of the world.

The last Phoenix Force mission against TRIO involved their old friend John Trent, whom Stony Man believed had been responsible for the assassination of an executive for a Japanese automotive company. For this mission, they went to Col. Ken Ikeda, a Kompei officer they worked with when Keio Ohara was part of the team. They would learn that Trent was innocent of the crime. Trent and Phoenix Force would work with the Green Tiger Clan, a Yakuza clan that rivaled the Snake Clan, to bring down TRIO once and for all.

Terrorist organizations
The New Order
First appearing in Phoenix Force #41, Amazon Strike, this terrorist group is a neo-Nazi organization that was based in the Amazon jungle of Brazil. Its leader was Kurt Mohn, German industrialist. He was the son of Maj. Joachim Mohn, an SS officer, and Anna Kaufmann, a retired German showgirl. All his life, the young Kurt Mohn was indoctrinated into the beliefs of Adolf Hitler and the Third Reich. When his father died, Mohn inherited his company, Mohn Industries, which the former SS major founded with a substantial amount of cash he had accumulated during World War II.

To finance the New Order's activities, Mohn established a cocaine smuggling ring in the Amazon, buying highly placed officials in the Brazilian government. This prompted a Brazilian police officer, Lt. Louis Farrango, to go to his DEA contact first, followed up by a secret visit to the Brazilian president, who told Farrango that he suspected that a secret cabal in his administration was consorting with an outside enemy group, later revealed to be the New Order.

For this mission, Phoenix Force and Stony Man chief pilot Jack Grimaldi joined forces with Farrango and his informant, a drug user named Jorgio Cavantes. However, during the mission, Cavantes betrayed Phoenix Force, leading them into an ambush, resulting in Katz, James and Manning getting captured by Mohn's men. Cavantes would later expose Louis Farrango to his New Order masters, resulting in the Brazilian policeman getting captured and tortured. Encizo and McCarter, the only members of Phoenix Force not captured, came to his rescue, but were too late to save his life.

During their captivity, Katz, James and Manning discovered that Farrango's partner, Emilio Santoro, who had infiltrated Mohn's organization, had been uncovered by the New Order and exposed to a lethal bacteriological weapon developed by the New Order. Called the Armageddon Virus, Mohn intended it to be used in a campaign of terror against the world's major nations, believing it would pave the way for a New Order takeover. However, Phoenix Force and Grimaldi, with the help of captured members of a Brazilian Indian tribe, ended Mohn's twisted scheme, destroying the data regarding the virus and obliterating the complex. Mohn escaped in the confusion, and has not been seen since.

This mission is a pivotal incident in Stony Man history, because it is when Jack Grimaldi first used the Dragon Slayer, Stony Man's first operational combat helicopter.

Foreign intelligence agencies
The KGB
The Russian KGB was a recurring antagonist in the history of Stony Man. As the most famous and important intelligence agency of the Soviet Union during the Cold War, the KGB attempted to spread Soviet influence, and Communism in general, wherever and whenever the opportunity arose. This was often accomplished using less savory methods.

The KGB's credits include sponsoring terrorist activities, assassination of Western diplomats, theft of prototype nuclear missiles, kidnapping American researchers, and various other dastardly acts. Many of their plots have been foiled or brought to a halt by swift action from either Mack Bolan, Phoenix Force or Able Team; however, on one occasion (as noted previously), Phoenix Force has actually cooperated with the KGB to prevent a stolen Soviet biological agent from falling into undesirable hands.

Despite their frequent failures due to the intervention of Mack Bolan and Stony Man, the Kremlin was not easily deterred by failure, and the KGB continued to conduct further covert warfare against the West until its demise in 1991 as a result of the end of the Cold War.

Headquarters 
The headquarters of Stony Man is known as Stony Man Farm because it appears to the world as a working farm and its proximity to Stony Man Mountain, located in Shenandoah National Park.  Stony Man Farm got its name because of its proximity to Stony Man Mountain where the face of the mountain resembles a dour-looking Indian chief.

See also
Mack Bolan
Able Team
Phoenix Force
The Executioner (book series)

External links
MackBolan.com
Official Don Pendleton Website

Series of books
Fictional intelligence agencies